In biochemistry, cis-trans isomerase is a type of isomerase which catalyzes the isomerization of geometric isomers.

Examples include photoisomerase and immunophilins such as cyclophilin.

External links
 

Isomerases